The men's marathon 10 kilometre competition of the swimming events at the 2019 Pan American Games were held on August 4, 2019 at Laguna Bujama.

In July 2020, Taylor Abbott inherited the silver medal and Victor Colonese inherited the bronze medal, three weeks after the announcement of doping by Argentine Guillermo Bertola, who had been silver in the race.

Schedule

Results

References

Swimming at the 2019 Pan American Games